Tolomeo Gallio (also spelled Gallo and Galli; 25 September 1527 – 3 or 4 February 1607) was an Italian Cardinal.

Biography
In the time of Pope Gregory XIII, he acted as papal secretary of state (in office 1572 to 1585), having a key role in the curia. 

He built the Villa d'Este, in his birthplace Cernobbio, in 1568, as a summer residence; and the Palazzo Gallio of  Gravedona.

He was bishop of Martirano in 1560, archbishop of Manfredonia in 1562, bishop of Albano in 1587, bishop of Sabina in 1589, bishop of Frascati in 1591, bishop of Porto e Santa Rufina in 1600, bishop of Ostia in 1603.

Tolomeo in 1595 acquired the County of Alvito (later Duchy) in southern Lazio, which he assigned to his nephew Tolomeo; the Gallio family held the fief until 1806.

Episcopal succession

Notes

External links
 
Biography 
Biography 
Gaetano Moroni, ‘GALLI Tolomeo’, in Dizionario di erudizione storico-ecclesiastica da S. Pietro sino ai nostri giorni,  (Venice: Tipografia Emiliana, 1844) XXVIII, pp. 120-121.

1527 births
1607 deaths
17th-century Italian cardinals
Cardinal-bishops of Albano
Cardinal-bishops of Frascati
Cardinal-bishops of Ostia
Cardinal-bishops of Porto
Cardinal-bishops of Sabina
Cardinal Secretaries of State
Deans of the College of Cardinals
17th-century Italian Roman Catholic bishops
People from Cernobbio